PTX may refer to:

Places
 Plano, Texas, a city in the United States
 Contador Airport (IATA airport code: PTX, ICAO airport code: SKPI) Pitalito, Huila, Colombia.
 Putian West railway station (rail code: PTX) Guancheng Hui, Zhengzhou, Henan, China

Biology and medicine
 Pentraxin, a protein domain and family
 Paclitaxel, an anticancer drug
 Pertussis toxin, an inhibitor of G-protein coupled receptors
 Palytoxin, an extremely poisonous vasoconstrictor
 Picrotoxin, a poisonous crystalline plant alkaloid
 Pumiliotoxin, found in dart frogs
 Pneumothorax, a medical condition affecting the lungs

Computing
 ptx (Unix), a Unix command-line utility producing a permuted index
 Parallel Thread Execution, an intermediary assembler language by NVIDIA
 .ptx, RAW image format for Pentax cameras
 PTX, a series of fictional robots in the video game 2nd Super Robot Wars Original Generation
 Pro Tools 10 or later session (project) file

Other uses
 PTX, a series of military explosives from WWII, see List of explosives used during World War II
 Pentatonix, an American a cappella group
 PTX (album), a 2014 album by Pentatonix
 Prescient Therapeutics (stock ticker: PTX) drug company
 Pillowtex Corporation (stock ticker: PTX) bedware company

See also

 Providence Therapeutics (product code prefix: PTX) a biotechnology company